Full Metal Panic! is a Japanese anime television series directed by Koichi Chigira and animated by Gonzo. They are based on the light novel series of the same name, written by Shoji Gatoh and illustrated by Shiki Douji, using material from the first three novels (Fighting Boy Meets Girl, Running One Night Stand, and Into the Blue) of the series over 24 episodes. The series focuses on Sousuke Sagara, a Sergeant from the mercenary group Mithril who is assigned to enroll into a Japanese high school to protect Kaname Chidori, a student with a special gift. The first season began in Japan, on January 8, 2002, and ended on June 18, 2002.

For the North American release, the series was licensed by ADV Films.

Episode list

References

General

2004 Japanese television seasons
Full Metal Panic!